Gregor Piatigorsky (Grigoriy Pavlovich Pyatigorskiy; August 6, 1976) was a Russian Empire-born American cellist.

Biography

Early life
Gregor Piatigorsky was born in Ekaterinoslav (now Dnipro, Ukraine) into a Jewish family. As a child, he was taught violin and piano by his father. After seeing and hearing the cello, he was determined to become a cellist and was given his first cello when he was seven.

Piatigorsky won a scholarship to the Moscow Conservatory, studying with Alfred von Glehn, Anatoliy Brandukov, and a certain Gubariov. At the same time, he was earning money for his family by playing in local cafés.

Piatigorsky was 13 when the Russian Revolution took place. Shortly afterwards, he started playing in the Lenin Quartet. At 15, he was hired as the principal cellist for the Bolshoi Theater.

The Soviet authorities, specifically Anatoly Lunacharsky, would not allow Piatigorsky to travel abroad to further his studies, so he smuggled himself and his cello into Poland on a cattle train with a group of artists. One of the women was a heavy-set soprano who, when the border guards started shooting at them, grabbed Piatigorsky and his cello. The cello did not survive intact, but it was the only casualty.

Now 18, Piatigorsky studied briefly in Berlin and Leipzig, with Hugo Becker and Julius Klengel, playing in a trio in a Russian café to earn money for food. Among the patrons of the café were Emanuel Feuermann and Wilhelm Furtwängler. Furtwängler heard Piatigorsky and hired him as the principal cellist of the Berlin Philharmonic.

United States
In 1929, Piatigorsky first visited the United States, playing with the Philadelphia Orchestra under Leopold Stokowski and the New York Philharmonic under Willem Mengelberg. In Ann Arbor, Michigan, in January 1937 he married Jacqueline de Rothschild, daughter of Édouard Alphonse James de Rothschild of the wealthy Rothschild banking family of France. That fall, after returning to France, they had their first child, daughter Jephta. Following the Nazi occupation in World War II, the family fled the country back to the States and settled in Elizabethtown in the Adirondack Mountains, New York. Their son, Joram, was born in Elizabethtown in 1940.

From 1941 to 1949, Piatigorsky was head of the cello department at the Curtis Institute of Music in Philadelphia, and he also taught at Tanglewood, Boston University, and the University of Southern California, the last of which he remained associated with until his death. USC established the Piatigorsky Chair of Violoncello in 1974 to honor Piatigorsky.

Piatigorsky participated in a chamber group with Arthur Rubinstein (piano), William Primrose (viola) and Jascha Heifetz (violin). Referred to in some circles as the "Million Dollar Trio", Rubinstein, Heifetz, and Piatigorsky made several recordings for RCA Victor.

Piatigorsky played chamber music privately with Heifetz, Vladimir Horowitz, Leonard Pennario, and Nathan Milstein. Piatigorsky also performed at Carnegie Hall with Horowitz and Milstein in the 1930s.

In 1965, his popular autobiography Cellist was published.

Gregor Piatigorsky died of lung cancer at his home in Los Angeles, California, in 1976. He was interred in the Westwood Village Memorial Park Cemetery in Los Angeles.

Instrument

He owned two Stradivarius cellos, the "Batta" and the "Baudiot". From 1939 to 1951 Piatigorsky also owned the famous 1739 Domenico Montagnana cello known as the "Sleeping Beauty".

Appraisal

It has been reported that the great violin pedagogue Ivan Galamian once described Piatigorsky as the greatest string player of all time. He was an extraordinarily dramatic player. His orientation as a performer was to convey the maximum expression embodied in a piece. He brought a great authenticity to his understanding of this expression. He was able to communicate this authenticity because he had had extensive personal and professional contact with many of the great composers of the day.

Many of those composers wrote pieces for him, including Sergei Prokofiev (Cello Concerto), Paul Hindemith (Cello Concerto), Mario Castelnuovo-Tedesco (Cello Concerto), William Walton (Cello Concerto), Vernon Duke (Cello Concerto), and Igor Stravinsky (Piatigorsky and Stravinsky collaborated on the arrangement of Stravinsky's "Suite Italienne", which was extracted from Pulcinella, for cello and piano; Stravinsky demonstrated an extraordinary method of calculating fifty-fifty royalties). At a rehearsal of Richard Strauss's Don Quixote, which Piatigorsky performed with the composer conducting, after the dramatic slow variation in D minor, Strauss announced to the orchestra, "Now I've heard my Don Quixote as I imagined him."

Piatigorsky had a magnificent sound characterized by a distinctive fast and intense vibrato and he was able to execute with consummate articulation all manner of extremely difficult bowings, including a downbow staccato of which other string players could not help but be in awe. He often attributed his penchant for drama to his student days when he accepted an engagement playing during the intermissions in recitals by the great Russian basso, Feodor Chaliapin. Chaliapin, when portraying his dramatic roles, such as the title role in Boris Godunov, would not only sing, but declaim, almost shouting. On encountering him one day, the young Piatigorsky told him, "You talk too much and don't sing enough." Chaliapin responded, "You sing too much and don't talk enough." Piatigorsky thought about this and from that point on, tried to incorporate the kind of drama and expression he heard in Chaliapin's singing into his own artistic expression.

Works
Piatigorsky was also a composer. His Variations on a Paganini Theme (based on Caprice No. 24) was composed in 1946 for cello and orchestra and was orchestrated by his longtime accompanist Ralph Berkowitz; it was later transcribed for cello and piano.
Each of the fifteen variations whimsically portrays one of Piatigorsky's musician colleagues. Denis Brott, a student of Piatigorsky, identified them as:
Casals,
Hindemith,
Garbousova,
Morini,
Salmond,
Szigeti,
Menuhin,
Milstein,
Kreisler,
a self-portrait of Piatigorsky himself,
Cassadó,
Elman,
Bolognini,
Heifetz, and
Horowitz.

Partial discography
Heifetz, Primrose & Piatigorsky (RCA Victor LP LSC-2563)     RCA Victor Red Seal  1961
Heifetz & Piatigorsky (Stereo LP LSC-3009)     RCA Victor Red Seal  1968
The Heifetz Piatigorsky Concerts (21-CD boxed set, original album collection) Sony-RCA 88725451452,  2013

Chess
Piatigorsky also enjoyed playing chess. His wife, Jacqueline Piatigorsky, was a strong player who played in several US women's championships and represented the United States in the women's Chess Olympiad. In 1963, the Piatigorskys organized and financed a strong international tournament in Los Angeles, won by Paul Keres and Tigran Petrosian. A second Piatigorsky Cup was held in Santa Monica in 1966, and was won by Boris Spassky.

References

Further reading
 His autobiography: Cellist (1965). Doubleday. Limited edition reprint: Da Capo Press (1976). 

 
"With the Artists".  World Famed String Players Discuss Their Art, Samuel and Sada Applebaum, John Markert & Co., New York (1955).  Pages 192-202 are devoted to Gregor Piatigorsky.
Jump in the Waves, a Memoir, Jacqueline Piatigorsky, St. Martin's Press, New York (1988).  .

External links
 http://www.piatigorskyarchives.org
 Biography at cello.org
 
 
 Youtube: An Afternoon with Gregor Piatigorsky (1976) Short documentary by Steve Grumette, including student Raphael Wallfisch.

1903 births
1976 deaths
Russian cellists
Deaths from lung cancer
Jewish classical musicians
American music educators
Grammy Award winners
American classical cellists
Moscow Conservatory alumni
Players of the Berlin Philharmonic
Honorary Members of the Royal Philharmonic Society
Soviet emigrants to Germany
German emigrants to the United States
Jews from the Russian Empire
Chess patrons
Burials at Westwood Village Memorial Park Cemetery
People from Elizabethtown, New York
20th-century classical musicians
20th-century American musicians
20th-century German musicians
Educators from New York (state)
Jewish Ukrainian musicians
Ukrainian Jews
20th-century cellists